Dhanraj Pillay (born 16 July 1968) is a retired Indian field hockey player and former captain of the India national team. He also looks after the Air India Sports Promotion Board as a Joint Secretary based in Mumbai. For the last 5 years, Dhanraj is overseeing the SAG Hockey Academy in Gujarat funded by the Gujarat Government. He is widely regarded as one of the best Indian players of hockey.

Pillay born to a Tamil family made his debut in 1989 with the national team and in a career spanning over 15 years, appeared for India in four Olympic Games, World Cups and Champion Trophies each. He made 339 appearances for the national team and is recorded, unofficially, to have scored 170 goals. He also played for clubs in countries such as Malaysia, France, England and Germany. Recognizing his achievements, he was awarded the Padma Shri by the government of India in 2000.He joined Aam Aadmi Party in February 2014 and started his political career.

International career
Dhanraj Pillay, whose career spanned from December 1989 to August 2004, played 339 international matches. The Indian Hockey Federation did not keep official statistics for the goals scored. There is no credible information on the number of international goals scored by Dhanraj. He scored around 170 goals in his career, according to both him and leading statisticians in the world. He is the only player to have played in four Olympics (1992, 1996, 2000, and 2004), four World Cups (1990, 1994, 1998, and 2002), four Champions Trophies (1995, 1996, 2002, and 2003), and four Asian Games (1990, 1994, 1998, and 2002). India won the Asian Games (1998) and Asia Cup (2003) under his captaincy. He was also the highest goal scorer in the Bangkok Asian Games and was the only Indian player to figure in the World Eleven side during the 1994 World Cup at Sydney.

Club Hockey
He has also played for foreign clubs like the Indian Gymkhana (London), HC Lyon (France), BSN HC & Telekom Malaysia HC (Malaysia), Abahani Limited, HTC Stuttgart Kickers (Germany) and Khalsa Sports Club (Hong Kong). Towards the end of his career, Dhanraj played in the Premier Hockey League for the Maratha Warriors for two seasons.

Dhanraj Pillay turned up for the Karnataka Lions in the World Series Hockey being played in India. He scored two goals for his team, captained by ex-India captain Arjun Halappa. He also played for Indian Airlines in Beighton Cup. He is currently the coach of the same team.

Awards
He is the recipient of India's highest sporting honour, the Major Dhyan Chand Khel Ratna award for the year 1999–2000. He was awarded the Padma Shri, a civilian award in 2001. He was the captain of the 1998 Asian Games and 2003 Asia Cup winning hockey team. He was awarded the player of the tournament award in the 2002 Champions trophy held at Cologne, Germany. In 2017, East Bengal Club conferred Pillay with Bharat Gaurav award.

Politics
He joined Aam Aadmi Party in February 2014 and started his political career.

Controversies
Dhanraj is often described as mercurial and has had his share of controversies. Time and again, he has vented this ire against the Hockey Management. He was not selected for the Indian team after the triumph at the Bangkok Asiad. The official reason given was that Dhanraj and 6 other senior players were rested. But it was largely seen as a retaliation for his outburst against the management for improper reception and non-payment of match fees. He protested against the low team stipend on overseas tours before the 1998 series against Pakistan. On receipt of the Khel Ratna, Pillay commented, "The award will help erase some bitter memories".

His plans to start a hockey academy at Mumbai have not taken off fully as Mumbai Hockey Association has refused to allow its astroturf facility to be used for training.

Biography
Pillay's biography, Forgive Me Amma, written by journalist Sundeep Misra, who tracked his career for over two decades, released in 2007.

References

External links
 

Dhanraj Pillay's career statistics
Bio at dimdima.com
Achievements Table

1968 births
Living people
Male field hockey forwards
Olympic field hockey players of India
Field hockey players at the 1990 Asian Games
Field hockey players at the 1992 Summer Olympics
Field hockey players at the 1994 Asian Games
Field hockey players at the 1996 Summer Olympics
Field hockey players at the 1998 Asian Games
1998 Men's Hockey World Cup players
Field hockey players at the 2000 Summer Olympics
Field hockey players at the 2002 Asian Games
2002 Men's Hockey World Cup players
Field hockey players at the 2004 Summer Olympics
Recipients of the Khel Ratna Award
Recipients of the Padma Shri in sports
Tamil sportspeople
Field hockey players from Pune
Recipients of the Arjuna Award
Asian Games medalists in field hockey
World Series Hockey players
Indian male field hockey players
Asian Games gold medalists for India
Asian Games silver medalists for India
Medalists at the 1990 Asian Games
Medalists at the 1994 Asian Games
Medalists at the 1998 Asian Games
Medalists at the 2002 Asian Games
1990 Men's Hockey World Cup players